R99 may refer to:
 R99 (New York City Subway car)
 R99 (star)
 Embraer R-99, a Brazilian Air Force military aircraft
 
 , a destroyer of the Royal Navy